Benninger is a surname. Notable people with the surname include: 

Christopher Charles Benninger (born 1942), American-Indian architect and planner
Fred Benninger (1917–2004), German-American businessman

See also
Henninger